Edmund la Touche Armstrong (1864–1946) was an Australian historian and librarian.

He was chief librarian of the Public Library of Victoria, afterwards known as the State Library of Victoria.

References

1864 births
1946 deaths
People from Geelong
20th-century Australian historians
Australian librarians
19th-century Australian historians